Olam HaTohu ( "The World of Tohu-Chaos/Confusion") and Olam HaTikun ( "The World of Tikun-Order/Rectification") are two general stages in Jewish Kabbalah, in the order of descending spiritual worlds (Olamot). In subsequent creation they also represent two archetypal spiritual states of being and consciousness. Their concepts derive from the new scheme of Lurianic Kabbalah by Isaac Luria (1534–1572), the father of modern Kabbalah, based on his interpretation of classic references in the Zohar.

The implications of Tohu-Tikun underlie the origin of free will and the realm of Kelipah (evil), caused by Shevirat HaKelim/Shevirah ( "Shattering of the Vessels" of Tohu), the processes of spiritual and physical exile and redemption, the meaning of the 613 commandments (mitzvot), and the messianic rectification of existence. Through this, Tikkun also has an active meaning, the esoteric Birur/Beirur/Birurim ( "Sifting/Clarification") of concealed Nitzotz/Nitzutzei Kodesh/Nitzutzot ( Sparks of Holiness) exiled in physical creation. This new paradigm in Kabbalah replaced the previous linear description of descent with a dynamic process of spiritual enclothement, where higher "souls" invest inwardly in lower "vessels". Related to the primordial cosmic realms of Tohu-Tikun are two associated spiritual states for interpreting existence, psychological temperaments, or stages in the spiritual development of the individual.

The cosmic drama of Tikun in Lurianic Kabbalah inspired the 16th-18th century popular Jewish imagination, explaining contemporary oppression and supporting messiah claimants but the most important Tikun is to have peace and order in Creation. The revivalist Hasidic movement, from the 18th century onwards, internalised esoteric Lurianism through its own concern with experiencing divine omnipresence amidst daily material life. The terminology of the modern Jewish ideal of Tikkun Olam ("Fixing the World") is taken from the Lurianic concept, but applied more widely to ethical activism in contemporary society.

Overview of Lurianic Kabbalah

Isaac Luria reinterpreted the whole scheme of Kabbalah in the 16th century, essentially making the second of two different versions of theoretical Kabbalah: the Medieval/Classic/Zoharic (later systemised by Moshe Cordovero directly prior to Luria in Safed), and the Lurianic. However, he understood his new doctrinal revelation as no more than the true meaning and deeper systemisation of the Zohar. Lurianic Kabbalah became the dominant system in Jewish mysticism, displacing Cordovero's, and afterwards the Zohar was read by Jewish Kabbalists in its light.

Medieval Kabbalah depicts a linear descending hierarchy of Divine vitality, the 10 sephirot (Divine attributes) emerging from concealment in the Ein Sof (unknowable simple Divine Infinity) to enact Creation, with the Four Worlds unfolding sequentially until physical creation. Lurianic Kabbalah, in contrast, describes a dynamic enclothing processes of exile and redemption in the Divine flow, where higher levels descend into lower states, as souls to spiritual bodies. This process introduces or interprets new Kabbalistic doctrines and concepts.

In the Lurianic scheme, Creation is initiated by a primordial radical Divine "self-withdrawal" (Tzimtzum), forming a figurative "empty space/vacuum" (Khalal) in which only an "imprint" (Reshimu) remains of the withdrawn Ein Sof. Subsequent to this, a thin, diminished new emanation "ray/line" (Kav), able to create finitude, extends from the withdrawn infinite light into the vacuum. This represents the latently finite potentials in the Ein Sof. The new emanation is the fountainhead for all subsequent creation, but instead leads to a catastrophe in the emerging spiritual Worlds.  Because the sephirot are pure and unrelated to each other at this stage, each attribute alone is unable to contain the enormity of the Divine light as it descends into them, and the "vessels" (Keilim) of the sephirot undergo a "shattering" (Shevirah), creating the World of "Chaos" (tohu). Their Divine light is released and reascends, while the broken vessel fragments descend, still animated by "sparks" (Nitzotz) of light. The fragments become the absorbed, animating source of the subsequent Four spiritual Worlds in stable Creation (called the realms of "rectification"-Tikun). As the fragments are animated by exiled Divine sparks, a consciousness unaware of its Divine dependence, so resulting Creation is able to exist independently, rather than being nullified by its source. This process, however, overspills into the realms of evil ("shells"-Kelipah). Tikun is supremely embodied in the highest of the Four Worlds, the Divine Unity perfected world of Atzilut ("emanation"), through the sephirot reconfiguring as Partzufim (harmonised Divine "configurations"). Rectification of the independent lower three worlds of Beri'ah ("creation"), Yetzirah ("formation") and Assiah ("action") is the task of man. Biblical Adam incorporated the collective souls of humanity before eating from the Tree of Knowledge (a manifestation in Kabbalah of the sephirot). His sin introduced new Shevirah dispersal of Divine vitality into exile in Creation, as well as shedding soul sparks from his being. The election of Israel through receiving the Torah at Sinai, recollected the 600,000 root souls from Adam. The 613 Mitzvot Jewish observances redeem ("sift"-Birur) the exiled sparks of holiness from Tohu, embedded below in physical creation. The messianic era for all peoples is inaugurated when the collective souls of Israel complete the esoteric cosmic Tikun. National and individual spiritual failures in Jewish history delay redemption, by introducing further exile of Divine vitality to the realms of impurity. Each root soul subdivides into soul sparks that reincarnate (Gilgulim) to complete cosmic and personal Tikun, as in Lurianism higher levels return dynamically in lower vessels. The messianic redemption combines both advantages of the supreme Divine lights of Tohu, in mature rectified vessels of Tikun, the unity of God and Creation.

The supernal worlds of Tohu and Tikun

Origin of Igul-Circle and Yashar-Line

Cordovero, in his comprehensive systemisation of Medieval Kabbalah, had reconciled previous Kabbalists' opinions of the sephirot by describing each as Divine ohr ("light") invested in 10 spiritual keilim ("vessels"). This overcame the philosophical difficulty of Divine attributes, as in the Infinite Ein Sof prior to Creation, the sephirot were entirely nullified into non-existence in the simple unity of endless Divinity. They emerge as Divine attributes only from the perspective of creation, by combining two aspects of lights and vessels. The spiritual vitality, denoted as "light", similarly manifests in two levels of Ohr Sovev (transcendent) and Ohr Mimalei (immanent). First the light creates the vessels, then animates (fills) them. Only the vessels differ in each of their natures, while the light remains unified.

Isaac Luria accepted this, but adapted it to his new scheme. As the Kav ("ray") of Divine illumination shines into the Khalal (primordial "vacuum"), beginning Creation, it first forms the pristine realm of Adam Kadmon ("Primordial Man"), described in previous Kabbalah, the first of the comprehensive Five spiritual Worlds. Adam Kadmon is the realm of Keter ("crown"), supra-conscious Divine Will. Due to its supreme transcendence, it is often excluded from listing with the other Four Worlds. Medieval Kabbalists listed Keter as the first Sephirah, but debated its relationship with the Ein Sof Limitless Divine. Luria described Keter as an intermediary to the sephirot, not identified with the Ein Sof, but transcending the sephirot. He excludes it from their usual listing, substituting Daat ("knowledge") instead. If the sephirot are listed in relation to their vessels, Chokhmah ("wisdom") becomes the first principle. Adam Kadmon is all light with no vessels, before the emergence of the sephirot; its expanse within the Khalal is limited by the power of the Reshima ("impression" left in the empty vacuum), and by its own future potential to create vessels. Adam Kadmon is the specific Divine "will" (Keter) and "plan" (the latent Chokhmah within Keter) for all subsequent detailed creation in potential. Its anthropomorphic name figuratively denotes that man is both the purpose of creation below, as well as the embodiment on high of the sephirot Divine attributes, not yet manifest.

The sephirot manifest in two general metaphorical-figurative schemes, as Igulim (concentric "circles" within the "circular" Khalal) and Yosher/Yashar (the three-column "upright" diagram, related to the "line" beamed into the Khalal). Igul-Circle denotes potential creation encompassed within, the female principle. Yashar-Line denotes manifest creation, the male principle, where creation proceeds as a hierarchical progression. As Igulim, 10 concentric "circles", the sephirot act sequentially and independently from each other, from Keter in closest proximity to the Ein Sof, to Malkhut at the centre. As Yosher, "upright" 3-column linear scheme, the sephirot act as a harmonised configuration of related powers in the scheme of man. As in the soul of man, and represented in his bodily form, each sephirah fulfils its particular function, while co-relating and sharing with the other powers as a whole arrangement. As Adam Kadmon is before the emergence of the sephirot, it relates to both schemes only in latent ("transcendent") potential. As the Kav shines into the vacuum, it first emanates the 10 sequential Igulim, then is "enclothed" by the Yosher scheme as Adam Kadmon.

Emergence of the sephirot - Akudim, Nekudim, Berudim
From Adam Kadmon emanate five lights. As the Yosher scheme relates to the figure of man, and Adam Kadmon embodies Keter (Will-"crown") and its latent Chokhmah (intellectual plan-"wisdom"), so these five lights figuratively emanate from the "head" of Adam Kadmon: from the "eyes, ears, nose, mouth and forehead". These interact with each other to form three specific olamot (worlds) after Adam Kadmon, three evolving stages in the first manifestation of the sephirot systemised by Luria:

 Akudim (world of "Binding/Ringed") 10 lights in one vessel - stable Tohu Chaos
 Nekudim (world of "Points/Spotted") 10 isolated lights in 10 vessels - unstable Tohu Chaos (Olam HaTohu-the "World of Chaos")
 Berudim (world of "Connection/Flecked") 10 inter-relating lights in 10 vessels - beginning of Tikun ("Rectification")

The terms are learned from the esoteric meaning of the story of Jacob's breeding of Laban's flocks in Genesis 30:27-43, where the terms Akudim, Nekudim and Teluim (Patched") are used. Akudim is yuli ("potential" creation), Nekudim is the sephirot acting as independent Iggulim (concentric "circles") absolute principles, Berudim is the sephirot acting as a harmonised Yosher ("upright" three-column configuration) where all principles work together: each sephirah is able to inter-relate with the other 9, by each latently incorporating each of the other principles. For example, Chesed (Kindness) and Gevurah (Severity) no longer oppose as absolute principles, but there is Kindness within Severity and Severity within Kindness. In the same way, all 10 sephirot subdivide into 10 x 10 = 100 latent principles, allowing the sephirot to harmonise as one system (as Yosher-Man).

The potency of Lurianic scheme, with its new doctrines and paradigm, arises from its power to systemise and unify previously unexplained and unrelated Kabbalistic notions. In this case, previously Iggulim and Yosher were alternative and complementary descriptions of the sephirot in Medieval Kabbalah. In Lurianic Kabbalah their difference becomes the root cause of the new process of dynamic crisis-catharsis in the Divine unfolding of Creation. Akudim is the initial stable stage of Olam HaTohu (the "World of Chaos"), the first emergence of the sephirot in undifferentiated unity, 10 lights encompassed in one vessel. In this supreme abundance of Divinity, there is no distinction between each sephirah, all Creation being included in potential. Luria read this as Genesis 1:1 "In the beginning God created the Heavens and the Earth", the initial vital source from which all would unfold. Nekudim is the secondary unstable form of chaos, referred to in general by "Olam HaTohu" (the "World of Chaos"), which precipitates the catastrophe of Shevirat HaKeilim ("shattering" of the sephirot "vessels"). Berudim is the initial incomplete stage of Olam HaTikun (the "World of Rectification"), beginning rectification of the sephirot, as it is reconstituted enough to exist stabily. However, supernal rectification is only completed subsequently in Atzilut (the world of "Emanation"), first of the comprehensive Four spiritual Worlds after the Shevirah, through the secondary transformation of the sephirot into Partzufim (Divine "Personas"). Atzilut, therefore, is generally referred to by "Olam HaTikun" (the "World of Rectification"). All three stages Akudim, Nekudim, Berudim are also described sometimes as three initial stages in the emergence of the World of Atzilut. However, in general, unqualified reference to "Atzilut" denotes its complete recified form after Berudim, the first of the comprehensive Four Worlds.

The World of Tohu and Shevirah-Shattering
In Kabbalah generally, the sephirot comprise the inner "life of God", their unification being the task of man. When the sephirot unite above in Atzilut (the perfected realm of Divinity), the Shekhinah (Divine Presence) unites with God below, and Divine blessing is channeled to physical creation. The classic section of the Zohar, "Patach Eliyahu", relates that the sephirot only exist from the perspective of Creation. From the Divine perspective only absolute Unity exists. The sephirot are the channels through which creation is enacted. In relation to creation, they become the revealed Divine "attributes", manifestated from concealment and nullification in the Ein Sof.

As the Lurianic scheme continues, in Nekudim (world of "Points"), the sephirot exist in separation and differentiation from each other, 10 distinct point principles, through 10 vessels without harmony. This state, Olam HaTohu (the "World of Chaos") was read by Luria in Genesis 1:2 "And the earth was Tohu and Bohu (Chaos and Void), with darkness over the surface of the deep..." Each sephirah emerges as an independent principle, so that intellect does not mediate the absolute emotional expressions; kindness, severity and so forth become opposing forces. This "flaw" in the Divine realm emerges because the sephirot are in the mode of Igulim ("Circles"), like discreet, sequential concentric circles. They become a "domain of pluralism" (the esoteric meaning of the Talmudic Sabbath Public Domain) rather than "domain of unity". The World of Tohu is characterised by very high Divine light, but weak vessels. Vessels paradoxically allow revelation of Divinity to Creation by restricting and containing the Divine abundance in stable limitations. In Tohu the lack of sharing between the vessels makes them immature, undeveloped and weak, while the Divine illumination overflows their capacity to contain. This causes the cosmic catastrophe of Shevirat HaKeilim ("Shattering" of the sephirot "Vessels"), introducing disharmony and exile throughout Divinity.

The light created each sephirah sequentially, first vessel, then the illumination within. Each sephirah's light contained also the subsequent diminishing lights to form the following lower sephirot. As the light of the Ein Sof radiated to form Keter, the vessel of Keter could absorb the life force. In turn, the vessels of Chochmah and Binah could absorb most of their flow, as their proximity to Keter made them strong enough, Keter extending enough relationship to them, as their motivating Will. Their excesses of light were able to encompass each as an Ohr Makif ("Surrounding light"). However, as the light proceeded to Daat, the root of the emotional sephirot, its vessel could not absorb the abundant radiance for the totality of the emotions, and shattered. This caused the total light to proceed downwards, shattering each vessel in turn. The succession was altered in Yesod, the channel of connection to Malchut-purpose. Initially, it received only the light for Malchut, which it projected on. It then also shattered under its own light. However, this enabled Malchut to partially absorb its light before collapsing; the lower, external aspects of Malchut were strengthened, so the collapse in Malchut was only partial.

Nitzutzot-Sparks of Holiness and the purpose of Shevirah
This doctrine is the Lurianic esoteric meaning of Genesis 36:31 and I Chronicles 1:43:
"These are the kings who reigned in the land of Edom before there reigned any king over the children of Israel..."
Edom is described in Genesis as the descendants of Esau. In the Kabbalistic scheme, the Patriarchs Abraham, Isaac and Jacob embodied respectively Chesed, Gevurah and Tiferet. Chesed and Gevurah are imbalanced, while Tiferet is harmony between the two. Consequently, while Jacob fathered the 12 tribes of Israel, Abraham gave birth to Ishmael, while Isaac gave birth to Esau. Esau and Ishmael are seen as the two spiritual roots for the Nations of the World. They are identified with unrectified Chesed and unrectified Gevurah respectively, Kindness and Severity of the World of Tohu-Chaos. In the Kabbalistic scheme they are rectified in the universal Messianic era, when all peoples will "go up to the mountain of the Lord" to follow the 7 Laws of Noah. The eight kings listed who reigned in Edom before any king of Israel, embodied the eight sephirot of Daat to Malchut in the World of Tohu, the vessels that shattered. Of each it says they lived and died, death connoting the soul-light of the sephirot ascending back to its source, while the body-vessel descends-shatters. Attached to the broken vessels are residues of the light, Nitzutzot-"Sparks" of holiness, as all Creation only continues to exist from non-existence by the Divine flow of Will. The sparks are the creative force of the Sephirot down the Four Worlds, giving life to the broken vessels, that become the descending beings of each realm. As they descend, they subdivide innumerable times. As the fragments contain only sparks of holiness, this allows them to become self-aware creations, rather than being nullified in Divine light. The unabsorbed residue of the broken vessels in our physical, lowest World Assiah becomes the realm of impurity and evil. To Kabbalah, as Creation is enacted through Divine "speech" as in Genesis 1, so gematria (numerical value of Hebrew letters) has spiritual meaning. In the supernal World of Atziluth-Emanation, the origin of our spiritual Order of Worlds, the sparks of holiness are said to subdivide into 288 general-root sparks, read out from the rest of Genesis 1:2, "...And the Spirit of God hovered over the waters." Merachepet-"hovered" splits into the number "288 died", the divided Divine sparks within the broken fragments.

The World of Tikun and Partzufim-Personas

The comprehensive Four Worlds of our created existence are together collectively the realms of Tikun ("Fixing"). Atzilut, the highest, is called specifically Olam HaTikun (the "World of Rectification"). In Atzilut, the Sephirot evolve into new partzufim arrangements, where they can unite. The different realms of Tikun are characterised in comparison to Tohu as lower lights and stronger vessels.

Subsequent to the interinclusion of the 10 Sephirot within each other, in Lurianic Kabbalah they then develop into "Partsufim" ("Personas"). Wide discussion of the Partsufim is found in the Medieval Kabbalah of the Zohar, before Isaac Luria. In the Zohar, Shimon bar Yochai expounds upon the spiritual roles of the Parsufim, by talking about them as independent spiritual manifestations. "The Holy Ancient of Days", or  "The Long Visage", two of the different Parsufim, are not just alternative adjectives for God, but are particular spiritual manifestations, levels and natures. Lurianic Kabbalah focused on the role of the Parsufim as the fully evolved stage of the primordial evolution of the Sephirot, in the beginning of Creation. Instead of each of the 10 Sephirot merely including a full subset of 10 Sephirot as latent potential forces, the first stage of their evolution, in the Parsufim the Sephirot become fully autonomous and interrelated. The name of each Partsuf denotes that the Sephirah from which it derived, has now become an independent scheme of 10 fully functioning Sephirot in the "Upright" (Yosher) form of "Man". This reconfiguration is essential in Lurianic Kabbalah to enable the opposing spiritual forces of the Sephirot to work together in harmony. Each Parsuf now operates independently, and unites with the other Parsufim. So, for example, "The Long Visage" is said to descend, and become enclothed within the lower Parsufim. The Sephirot now harmonise, to enable the Lurianic scheme of Tikkun (Rectification) to begin.

Supernal Tikun is completed in Atzilut through the sephirot evolving into the further stage of Partzufim (Divine "Configurations"). In the partzufim, rather than each sephirah partially inter-relating by latently incorporating the other powers, as in Berudim, instead all harmonise fully around one of their number, as complete autonomous Yosher schemes. The partzufim then interact and enclothe within each other through anthropomorphic relationships in Atzilut, channeling Divine vitality to lower worlds.

Active Tikun by Man

The soul of Adam and soul sparks

Birur-Extraction of sparks from the Kelipot

Iskafia-Subjugation and Ishapkha-Transformation

Eschatological Divinity in Jewish mysticism

Tohu and Tikun as psychological-spiritual states

Psychologically, a Tohu state is one of fragmentation. The various elements of one's personality are in conflict with each other and unable to work together in a cohesive fashion. A Tikkun state is one of harmony and integration.

Influence of the Lurianic Tikun in Jewish history

Earlier Cosmic Shemitot doctrine

Sabbatean mystical heresy

Hasidic Deveikut and material Birur

Contemporary ethical Tikun Olam

Photo gallery

See also
 Jewish diaspora
 Sefirot
 Tohu wa-bohu
 Yeridat ha-dorot#Generational ascent in Kabbalah

Notes

References
 Mystical Concepts in Chassidism: An Introduction to Kabbalistic Concepts and Doctrines, Jacob Immanuel Schochet, Kehot publications; also printed at end of English Likutei Amarim Tanya. Chapters on: Shevirat HaKelim, Tohu and Tikun, Birur and Tikun
 Thirty-Two Gates of Wisdom: Awakening Through  Kabbalah, DovBer Pinson, BenYehuda Press

External links
Glossary of Kabbalah and Chassidut, inner.org
The Development of Kabbalah in Three Stages: Evolution, Enclothement, Omnipresence-Cordoverian, Lurianic, Hasidic, inner.org

Kabbalah
Isaac Luria